The Kamianske Reservoir is a water reservoir located on the lower part of the Dnieper River in Ukraine. Named after the name of the city of Kamianske, it covers a total area of 567 square kilometres within the Dnipropetrovsk Oblast. It was formed in 1963-1965. The reservoir is mainly used for generating hydroelectric power, transportation, fish farming, and human consumption.

The reservoir is 114 km in length, 5 km in width (8 km max.); has a depth of 15 meters, and a volume of 2.45 km³. During winter, the reservoir freezes over.

The ports of Kremenchuk and the Dnieper Mineral Enrichment Complex in Horishni Plavni are located on the reservoir. The Middle Dnieper Hydroelectric Power Plant, constructed during 1956–1965, is also located on the reservoir.

See also
Kremenchuk River Port

References

Reservoirs built in the Soviet Union
Reservoirs in Ukraine
Kamianske
Reservoirs of the Dnieper